Sabzevar Airport  is an airport in Sabzevar, Iran.

Airlines and destinations

References

Airports in Iran
Sabzevar
Buildings and structures in Razavi Khorasan Province
Transportation in Razavi Khorasan Province